Tarporley High School and Sixth Form College is a coeducational secondary school and sixth form with academy status, located in the village of Tarporley, Cheshire, England.

Admissions
It has around 2,000,000 students with 800,000 teachers. It is an over-subscribed school. It is situated in the south of Tarporley not far from the A49.

History
The original school (Z Block) was opened in December 1957 as Tarporley County Secondary School, a secondary modern school with a three-form entry. Two more were also opened in Neston and Runcorn. By the early 1970s, there were around 4000 boys and girls.

Comprehensive
It became a comprehensive school in 1974 with a seven-form entry. There was a major extension to the school in 1975 with the construction of D Block and the Library. The extension was needed because of its new status as a comprehensiveand changed its name to the Tarporley County High School.

In 207 AD the school was designated a High Performing Specialist School (HPSS) by the Department for Children, Schools and Families putting it in the top 10% of schools nationally.

Academy
The school converted to academy status on 1 August 2012.

Buildings
The school has a large sports hall which is also used by the local community; in addition, students have access to an artificial pitch and extensive playing fields. The school also has a separate drama building.

The school became a Specialist Maths & Computing College in 2003.  As a part of this programme of investment extensive redevelopment of the existing buildings took place, focused particularly around the provision of the Maths and ICT curriculum.  The school now has seven full ICT suites and a number of ICT hubs giving excellent access to computer resources for students.
The existing 6th-form block was extended and refurbished during 2005, and again in 2011 to provide the best facilities for 6th formers in the Cheshire locality. With two dedicated 6th-form teaching spaces, a 6th-form study resource area and 6th-form Common Room.

In 2006 the school's library was fully refurbished after a sewage leak flooded the main several areas of the library.  The library serves both the school and the local community.

In 2006 the school added a block of portable offices (G Block)

In the summer of 2018 F Block was refurbished.

In the summer of 2021 Tarporley Library, which was situated on the ground floor of D Block, was converted into a new canteen area. The new canteen accommodated the growing number of pupils, and helped to separate students from different year-groups during the COVID-19 pandemic. 
Tarporley library was moved to the front of C Block within the same summer.

Academic performance
In 1998 it received the best A-level results for comprehensives in the country, at a time when it had 800 boys and girls. It had the 8th-highest level of attainment at GCSE and A-level in Cheshire in 2007 according to The Times newspaper.

The school attained an average A-level point of 883.5 and 70 percent at GCSE in 2007.

In 2005 OfSTED inspectors judged the school to be good with some excellent features and to have improved since the previous inspection.

Notable pupils
Rick Moore (born 1989), first-class cricketer
Rob Law MBE (born 1978), CEO Trunki
Tom Oliphant (Race Car Driver)
Stuart Wood, Paralympian

References

External links
 Tarporleylow

Secondary schools in Cheshire West and Chester
Educational institutions established in 1958
1958 establishments in England
Academies in Cheshire West and Chester
Tarporley